The Atoka County Times is a weekly paper that has served Atoka County, Oklahoma since 1950. It is locally owned.

References

Newspapers published in Oklahoma
Publications established in 1951
1951 establishments in Oklahoma
Atoka County, Oklahoma